Philipstown may refer to:
 Phillipstown, Caerphilly, Wales
 Phillipstown, New Zealand
 Phillipstown, Illinois, United States
 Phillipstown, Co. Louth Republic of Ireland

See also
 Philipstown